This page summarises the Australia national soccer team fixtures and results in 2013.

Summary
The team played their final four World Cup qualification matches. The two draws and two victories placed Australia second in the group to qualify for their fourth World Cup and the third in succession.

Australia then participated in the East Asian Cup for the first time. Due to the timing of the event Australia's first choice players were not available so a largely A-League based squad was used.

The team played a number of friendly matches towards the end of the year however successive 6–0 defeats resulted in coach Holger Osieck losing his job. He was replaced by Ange Postecoglou.

Record

Match results

Friendlies

World Cup qualifiers

East Asian Cup

Player statistics

References

External links
 Australia: Fixtures and Results

National soccer team
Australia national soccer team seasons